The Right Way or Right Way may refer to:

"The Right Way" (Peter Andre song), a 2004 song by Peter Andre
The Right Way (political party), an Israeli political faction
"The Right Way", a song by Tynisha Keli
Right Way (publisher), an imprint of Constable & Robinson
The Right Way (2004 film), a 2004 Canadian film
The Right Way (1921 film), a 1921 American silent drama film

See also
The Wright Way, British sitcom
The Right Thing, a principle for software development